7th Politburo may refer to:
7th Politburo of the Chinese Communist Party
7th Politburo of the Communist Party of Cuba
Politburo of the 7th Congress of the Russian Social Democratic Labour Party (Bolsheviks)
7th Politburo of the Party of Labour of Albania
7th Politburo of the Communist Party of Czechoslovakia
7th Politburo of the Socialist Unity Party of Germany
7th Politburo of the Polish United Workers' Party
7th Politburo of the Romanian Communist Party
7th Politburo of the Lao People's Revolutionary Party
7th Politburo of the Communist Party of Vietnam
7th Politburo of the League of Communists of Yugoslavia
7th Politburo of the Hungarian Socialist Workers' Party
7th Politburo of the Workers' Party of Korea